Liane Hielscher (born as Juliane Hielscher on 9 November 1935 in Schweidnitz, Silesia; died 26 January 2000 in Bad Aibling, Bavaria) is a German actress.

Life
Hielscher attended a business school and worked as an interpreter for three years. She took Joseph Offenbach's acting courses at the Deutsches Schauspielhaus. She made her first appearance on stage at Theater Hof.

In the 1970 she started working freelance, appearing as a guest on several stages and playing in numerous tours. 

In the 1970s and 80s, Hielscher mainly appeared on television. Moreover, she played supporting roles in films such as Edgar Reitz's Cardillac (1969), as well as main roles in Ula Stöckl's film Neun Leben hat die Katze (1968) and in Niklaus Schilling's . In 1988, she took a role in the American independent film Shuttlecock directed by Jerry R. Barrish. Besides, she dubbed Majel Barrett's voice in the science-fiction series Star Trek (Raumschiff Enterprise in German).

Hielscher died in 2000 at the age of 64. She was buried at Stephanskirchen near Rosenheim in southern Bavaria.

Autobiography
Hielscher wrote a book about her life and her illness which was published shortly before her death:

Filmography

 1961: Gestatten, mein Name ist Cox (television series, 1 episode)
 1967: Dreizehn Briefe (television series, 1 episode)
 1967:  (television series, 1 episode)
 1967:  
 1967: Det største spillet
 1968: Das Kriminalmuseum: Der Scheck (television series)
 1968: Bis zum Happy-End
 1968: The Cat Has Nine Lives
 1969: Cardillac
 1970: Die seltsamen Methoden des Franz Josef Wanninger (television series, 1 episode)
 1970: 
 1971: Das Geld liegt auf der Bank
 1971: 
 1972–1973: Sonderdezernat K1 (several episodes)
 1974: Hamburg Transit (television series)
 1974: : Einspielungen (television series)
 1975: Derrick: Ein Koffer aus Salzburg 
 1975–1979: PS (television series)
 1976: Notarztwagen 7 (television series)
 1977: Derrick: Yellow He 
 1977: MS Franziska (television series)
 1979: Tatort: Schweigegeld
 1979: Fallstudien (television film)
 1980:  (television series)
 1980: Die Weber (television film) 
 1981: Polizeiinspektion 1 (television series, 1 episode)
 1981: Ein Fall für zwei, episode 4: Todfreunde
 1983: Die Supernasen
 1983: 
 1984: Ein irres Feeling
 1987: Derrick: Koldaus letzte Reise
 1987: Moselbrück (television series)
 1987: Weiberwirtschaft (television series)
 1989: The Spirit
 1989: Shuttlecock
 1990: Derrick: Höllensturz
 1991: Hausmänner 
 1992: Sylter Geschichten (television series)
 1994: Derrick: Gib dem Mörder nicht die Hand
 1996: Immer Ärger mit Arno (television series)
 1996:  (television series)
 1997: Dr. Stefan Frank – Der Arzt, dem die Frauen vertrauen (television series)

References

External links
 
 Liane Hielscher, filmportal.de 
 Liane Hielscher, Deutsches Filmhaus 

20th-century German actresses
German stage actresses
German television actresses
German film actresses
People from Silesia
1935 births
2000 deaths
Burials in Bavaria